Satisfied is the fifth studio album by American singer-songwriter Taylor Dayne. It includes the single, "Beautiful" which went to Number 1 on the Billboard Hot Dance Charts in April 2008. "Crash" was used in a promotional commercial for the ABC network. This is Dayne's first album in ten years as well as her latest album to date.

The album includes both new material and recreations of some of her favorite contemporary songs. There are 3 cover songs on the album, including Red Hot Chili Peppers' Under the Bridge. Producers on this record include Rick Nowels, Gregg Alexander and Peter Wade.

Critical reception

The album has received positive to mixed reviews from music critics. AllMusic described Taylor's voice on the album as older and more mature and said that she also sounded "warm, rounded, and tonal". The site gave a positive response to her covers of "Under the Bridge", "Fool to Cry", and "Kissing You", and praised the album's first single, "Beautiful". Slant Magazine compliments the album track "Crash" by calling it a "bombastic Celine Dion-style power ballad".

Slant Magazine has given it a 2.5  star rating.

Track listing
 "Beautiful" (Taylor Dayne, Helgi M. Hubner) – 3:49
 "I'm Over My Head" (Josh Alexander, Billy Steinberg) – 3:15
 "My Heart Can't Change" (Gregg Alexander, Rick Nowels) – 3:45
 "She Don't Love You" (Teron Beal, Peter Wade Keusch, Jayms Madison) – 4:06
 "Under the Bridge" (Flea, John Frusciante, Anthony Kiedis, Chad Smith) – 4:03
 "Satisfied" (Mike Mondesir, Andrew Lewis Taylor) – 4:19
 "Dedicated" (John Graham Hill, Keusch, Stephanie McKay) – 3:51
 "Kissing You" (Tim Atack, Des'ree) – 4:09
 "Crash" (Jack David Elliot, Janice Robinson) – 4:33
 "The Fall" (Luigie Gonzalez, Dayne, Margie Hauser) – 3:42
 "Love Chain" (Brown, Dayne, Sebastian Nylund) – 3:52
 "Fool to Cry" (Mick Jagger, Keith Richards) – 3:33
 "Hymn" (Dayne, Luigie Gonzalez) – 3:10

References

Taylor Dayne albums
2008 albums
Albums with cover art by Tony Duran
Pop rock albums by American artists
Soul albums by American artists